Robert D. Rosenthal (born April 28, 1949) is a prominent Long Island businessman and wealth management professional. He is the founder, CEO of First Long Island Investors, a boutique wealth management firm.

Early life and education
Robert D. Rosenthal was born in New York City, New York, to Udith and George Rosenthal. He is the second of three children.

Rosenthal graduated cum laude from Boston University in 1971 and received a J.D. degree from Hofstra University School of Law in 1974. Rosenthal was admitted to the New York State Bar Association in 1975.

Career

Early work
Rosenthal began his career in 1971 at Entenmann's Inc. From 1971 until 1983, Rosenthal held various positions there, eventually becoming Executive Vice President and Chief Operating Officer. After working on the initial public offering for Entenmann's and assisting with the sale to Warner-Lambert in 1978 and then to General Foods in 1982. In 1983 Rosenthal left Entenmann's and started First Long Island Investors, LLC. He was a member of the Board of Directors of W.P. Stewart & Co., Inc. from 1993 through 1998 and chairman and chief executive officer of W.P. Stewart Asset Management (NA), Inc., a subsidiary of Stewart, and Deputy Managing Director of Stewart from 1998 to 2003. W.P. Stewart & Co., Ltd. was a New York Stock Exchange–listed global investment advisory business which Mr. Rosenthal helped take public in 2000. Stewart was purchased by AllianceBernstein L.P. in 2013. Rosenthal currently serves as lead director of Global Industrial (formerly Systemax), a New York Stock Exchange company.

New York Islanders
Rosenthal was co-chairman and Co-Chief Executive Officer of the New York Islanders from 1992 to 1997. He was part of a group which had a minority ownership in the franchise  and served as a member of the National Hockey League's Board of Governors during this time.  Bob was interviewed as part of ESPN's 30 for 30 Big Shot documentary.

First Long Island Investors, LLC 
First Long Island Investors provides comprehensive wealth management and family office services to affluent individuals and families as well as select institutions. The firm was founded on Long Island in 1983 and their clients are predominantly from the tristate area. The company's founders, Robert Rosenthal and Ralph Palleschi met while working at Entenmann's and lead the team that created and executed on the Entenmann family's exit strategy.  Rosenthal and Palleschi began managing the family's wealth after the business was sold and then realized that the strategies they used could be beneficial for others. First Long Island Investors takes a long-term view to preserving and growing the wealth of their clients. They employ a prudent asset allocation approach and develop customized plans for each client after developing an understanding of the client's individual goals, needs and risk tolerance.

Other
Rosenthal is a Trustee and member of the Board or Advisors of Northwell Health.  He currently serves as Treasurer of the Northwell Health System and co-chairman of the Investment Committee.  He is also chairman of the advisory board for North Shore University Hospital, the largest hospital in the system.

In May 2014, Rosenthal was recognized by the United Hospital Fund with their Distinguished Trustee Award for his service at Northwell Health.

Rosenthal was elected to the board of trustees of Hofstra University in 2006 and currently holds the position of Vice Chairman. Additionally he is the Chairman of their Endowment Committee.

On September 24, 2015, Robert D. Rosenthal was presented with one of five Awards for Alumni Achievement at Hofstra's annual Alumni Awards Dinner on September 24, 2015.

On May 2, 2019, Hofstra University held its 23rd Annual Gala and honored Robert D. Rosenthal for his years of dedication and service to the UniversityThe event raised a record-breaking 2.6 million dollars for scholarship. In addition to being the event honoree, Bob was presented with the Presidential Medal, one of the most prestigious awards given by the university.  Past Presidential Medal recipients include Dr. Henry Kissinger, Frank Sinatra, and Eli Weisel, among others.

Personal life 
Robert D. Rosenthal married Jodi Bernstein on August 7, 1993. He has four children – Julie, Jennifer (married to Adam Leitman Bailey), Lindsay (married to Andrew Maller), and Gregory. He is a member of the New York Breeders Association, racing horses out of Saratoga, Aqueduct, and Belmont. One of his horses, Galloping Grocer, named for his longtime partner in the horse business, Ira Waldbaum, was the 2 year old NY champion in 2004.  In October 2017, Berning Rose, a 2-year-old filly that Bob owns with Bradford Bernstein won the Maid of the Mist which is a New York-bred stakes race held at Belmont Park.

In recent years, Rosenthal has become more active in the Republican Party hosting events for Mitt Romney in 2012 and for the former Secretary of State, Condoleezza Rice and Senators Orrin Hatch and Bob Corker in 2014. In addition, in 2014 he hosted an event for Speaker of the House John Boehner and candidate for United States Congress, in New York's 1st congressional district, Lee Zeldin (who was subsequently elected to Congress).

References

American businesspeople
1949 births
Living people